This page documents the tornadoes and tornado outbreaks of 1990, primarily in the United States. Most tornadoes form in the U.S., although some events may take place internationally. Tornado statistics for older years like this often appear significantly lower than modern years due to fewer reports or confirmed tornadoes, however by the 1990s tornado statistics were coming closer to the numbers we see today.

Synopsis

1990 saw some unusual and powerful tornadoes and tornado outbreaks. On March 13 not one, but two F5 tornadoes struck Kansas, both coming from the same supercell. This was the only day since the 1974 Super Outbreak to have more than one F5 on the same day until the 2011 Super Outbreak, when four EF5 tornadoes touched down on April 27. In June, a strong outbreak struck the upper midwest United States and in late August a powerful F5 tornado struck the city of Plainfield, Illinois, resulting in significant loss of life and damage.

Events

Confirmed tornado total for the entire year 1990 in the United States.

January

There were 11 tornadoes confirmed in the US in January.

February
There were 57 tornadoes confirmed in the US in February.

February 19 (Japan) 
A landfalling waterspout struck Makurazaki, Kagoshima, killing 1 person and injuring 18 others. The tornado damaged 383 homes and completely destroyed 29. 88 houses were half destroyed, and 266 others were partially destroyed. 25 cars were rolled over as well.

March
There were 86 tornadoes confirmed in the US in March.

March 11–13

This destructive tornado outbreak produced at least 64 tornadoes across the region including four violent tornadoes. Two F5 tornadoes touched down north and east of Wichita, Kansas, including the most publicized tornado, which struck Hesston. In Nebraska, several strong tornadoes touched down across the southern and central portion of the state including an F4 that traveled for over 125 miles. Two people were killed in the outbreak in Kansas, both from the F5 tornadoes.

April
There were 108 tornadoes confirmed in the US in April.

May
There were 243 tornadoes confirmed in the US in May.

May 15

An outbreak of 17 tornadoes injured nine people in Texas and Kansas, with the strongest being an F3 tornado in Anson, Texas.

June
There were 329 tornadoes confirmed in the US in June.

June 2–3

This outbreak occurred in southern Illinois, central and southern Indiana, southwestern Ohio, and northern Kentucky on June 2 and June 3. 66 tornadoes struck the Ohio River Valley, including seven F4 twisters, resulting in nine deaths. One F4 tornado trekked  from southeastern Illinois into southern Indiana, killing one person. 37 tornadoes occurred in Indiana, eclipsing the previous record of 21 set during the 1974 Super Outbreak. In addition, 12 tornadoes struck Illinois.

July
There were 106 tornadoes confirmed in the US in July.

August
There were 60 tornadoes confirmed in the U.S. in August.

August 28

A storm system spawned numerous tornadoes on August 28, including the   devastating F5 Plainfield, Illinois tornado. The violent, rain wrapped tornado killed 29 people and injured 350. It is the only F5 tornado ever recorded in August and is the only F5 tornado on record to ever strike the Chicago area. Other tornadoes were also reported in parts of Canada, Michigan, and New York as well. An F3 tornado occurred near Elgin, Manitoba as well.

August 31

A tornado occurred in a suburb of Shanghai in association with Typhoon Abe.

September
There were 45 tornadoes confirmed in the US in September.

October
There were 35 tornadoes confirmed in the US in October.

October 18

A large tornado outbreak in the Eastern United States produced 16 tornadoes, including four F3 tornadoes in Union County, North Carolina, King William County, Virginia, Orange County, Virginia and Somerset County, New Jersey. There was one fatality and 76 injuries from the outbreak.

October 22
A funnel cloud was sighted in Cordova, and 2 miles north of Orangeburg. It moved southwest to northeast from north of Orangeburg, duplicate to Highway 601, and then it moved into Calhoun County, where an F2 tornado touched down shortly. It injured 4 people and killed a 11-year old girl. The tornado destroyed three mobile homes, two sheds, a room of a brick house, and a small concrete building. A house was moved off of its foundation by the tornado.

November
There were 18 tornadoes confirmed in the US in November.

December
There were 35 tornadoes confirmed in the US in December.

December 11-12 (Japan) 
A powerful F3 (F4 according to Ted Fujita) stovepipe tornado struck Mobara City while damaging 1747 homes and completely destroying 82 homes. 162 homes were half destroyed, and 1504 others were partially damaged. Steel-framed and reinforced concrete buildings were damaged, including a well-built hospital, and several vehicles were either thrown or overturned. The tornado caused power outages while killing 1 person and injuring 73 others. This tornado was part of a small outbreak that spawned at least four, and possibly as many as seven tornadoes in Japan, including the Mobara tornado.

December 20–23

A large, late-season outbreak of tornadoes affected Mississippi and Louisiana on December 20–22. Two tornadoes killed one person each in Mississippi on December 21. An F1 tornado touched down in Ohio on December 23 before the outbreak ended. In all, the outbreak killed two and injured 23.

See also
 Tornado
 Tornadoes by year
 Tornado records
 Tornado climatology
 Tornado myths
 List of tornado outbreaks
 List of F5 and EF5 tornadoes
 List of North American tornadoes and tornado outbreaks
 List of 21st-century Canadian tornadoes and tornado outbreaks
 List of European tornadoes and tornado outbreaks
 List of tornadoes and tornado outbreaks in Asia
 List of Southern Hemisphere tornadoes and tornado outbreaks
 List of tornadoes striking downtown areas
 Tornado intensity
 Fujita scale
 Enhanced Fujita scale

References

External links
 U.S. tornadoes in 1990 - Tornado History Project
 Tornado deaths monthly

 
1990 meteorology
Tornado-related lists by year
Torn